Walter Craig was an American football coach.  He served as the head football coach at Massachusetts Agricultural College—now the University of Massachusetts Amherst—for one season in 1905, compiling a record of 3–7.

Head coaching record

References

Year of birth missing
Year of death missing
UMass Minutemen football coaches